Alice Zorn is a Canadian author.

Biography
Originally from Hamilton, Ontario, Zorn now lives in Montreal, Quebec. She is known as the author of various short stories published in a wide variety of Canadian magazines, as well as the collection of short stories Ruins & Relics (2009) and the novels Arrhythmia (2011) and Five Roses (2016).

Zorn has published pieces of fiction in magazines including The New Quarterly, Room of One's Own, and Grain. One of her stories placed first in the Prairie Fire fiction contest in 2006 and 2011. Her first book, Ruins & Relics, a short story collection published by NeWest Press in March 2009, was a finalist for the 2009 Quebec Writers' Federation's McAuslan First Book Prize. Zorn has also participated in the Banff Writing Studio and the Quebec Federation Mentorship Program. Her first novel, Arrhythmia, was published in May 2011. Zorn's second novel, Five Roses, was published in July 2016 by Dundurn Press.

Bibliography
2009: Ruins & Relics 
2011: Arrhythmia
2016: Five Roses

References

Living people
Canadian women novelists
Canadian women short story writers
Writers from Hamilton, Ontario
Writers from Montreal
21st-century Canadian novelists
21st-century Canadian short story writers
21st-century Canadian women writers
Year of birth missing (living people)